Kosmos-2251 ( meaning Cosmos 2251), was a Russian Strela-2M military communications satellite. It was launched into Low Earth orbit from Site 132/1 at the Plesetsk Cosmodrome at 04:17 UTC on 16 June 1993, by a Kosmos-3M carrier rocket.· The Strela satellites had a lifespan of 5 years, and the Russian government reported that Kosmos-2251 ceased functioning in 1995. Russia was later criticised by The Space Review for leaving a defunct satellite in a congested orbit, rather than deorbiting it. In response, Russia noted that they were (and are) not required to do so under international law. In any case, the KAUR-1 satellites had no propulsion system, which is usually required for deorbiting.

Destruction

At 16:56 UTC on 10 February 2009, it collided with Iridium 33 (1997-051C), an Iridium satellite, in the first major collision of two satellites in Earth orbit. The Iridium satellite, which was operational at the time of the collision, was destroyed, as was Kosmos-2251. NASA reported that a large amount of debris was produced by the collision.

See also
Kessler Syndrome

References

Communications satellites in low Earth orbit
Spacecraft launched in 1993
Satellite collisions
Kosmos satellites
Satellites formerly orbiting Earth
Derelict satellites orbiting Earth
Spacecraft that broke apart in space